Blue parrot or Blue Parrot may refer to:

Bird:
Blue-backed parrot, a parrot endemic to the Philippines, Sulawesi and nearby islands in Indonesia
Blue-bellied parrot, a species of parrot from southeastern Brazil
Blue-cheeked parrot, a species of parrot found in northeast South America
Blue-collared parrot, a species of parrot found in the higher elevations of New Guinea.
Blue-fronted parrot, a South American species of parrot
Blue-headed parrot, a Central and South American species of parrot
Blue-naped parrot, a parrot from the Philippines and Borneo
Blue-rumped parrot, a small parrot from south-east Asia
Blue-winged parrot, a small parrot from Tasmania and south-east mainland Australia
Blue-and-yellow macaw, a species of parrot resident in tropical South America and Miami-Dade County, Florida
Anodorhynchus, a genus of large blue macaws from South America genus of large blue macaws from South America
Glaucous macaw, an all-blue macaw believed to be extinct
Hyacinth macaw, a blue macaw that is the longest and largest flying parrot
Lear's macaw, an all-blue Brazilian parrot

Other uses:
The Blue Parrot, a 1953 film
The Blue Parrot (book), a book by John Moore
Blue Parrot, the AIRPASS II radar system